Lee H. Pappas is an American entrepreneur and founder of a number of technology publications. He co-founded Atari 8-bit family enthusiast magazine ANALOG Computing in 1981. After the Atari ST was released, ANALOG spun-off a magazine for that computer: ST-Log. VideoGames & Computer Entertainment also started as a section within ANALOG Computing before becoming a separate publication. Pappas later founded  print magazines PC Laptop, TurboPlay, VISIO, Picture This!, and Home Theater Builder.  He is currently the CEO of Enflight, a provider of flight planning software for the aviation industry.

References

External links 
Personal website
Klanky's A.N.A.L.O.G. Computing website

Living people
Year of birth missing (living people)